Lumbatan, officially the Municipality of Lumbatan (Maranao: Inged a Lumbatan), is a 5th class municipality in the province of Lanao del Sur, Philippines. According to the 2020 census, it has a population of 22,780 people.

The town has a full view of Mount Makaturing.

History
Macadar, the old town of Lumbatan, Province of Sultan Mardan. 2nd District in Lanao del Sur, . ;Sultan Mardan in Macadar, was among to the 15th century rulers of the Sultanates of Lanao.

In 2004, nine barangays of Lumbatan were made into Lumbaca-Unayan, a separate municipality.

Barangay Ligue was created out of barangay Pantar in pursuant to Muslim Mindanao Autonomy Act No. 79 dated 27 October 1998, which was ratified through a plebiscite conducted by the COMELEC on March 25, 2006.

Geography

Barangays
Lumbatan is politically subdivided into 21 barangays.

Climate

Demographics

Economy

References

External links
 Lumbatan Profile at the DTI Cities and Municipalities Competitive Index
 [ Philippine Standard Geographic Code]
 Philippine Standard Geographic Code
 Philippine Census Information
 Local Governance Performance Management System

Municipalities of Lanao del Sur
Populated places on Lake Lanao